Belemnites is a genus of an extinct group of cephalopods belonging to the order Belemnitida. These cephalopods existed in the Early Jurassic period from the Hettangian age (196.5–199.6 mya) to the Toarcian age (175.6–183.0). They were fast-moving nektonic carnivores.

The scientific name Belemnites of this genus should not be confused with the common name  of the cephalopods included in the extinct order Belemnitida (commonly referred to as "Belemnites").

Species
Belemnites calloviensis
Belemnites hastati
Belemnites hastatus
Belemnites paxillosus

See also

 Belemnite
 List of belemnites

References

Paleobiology Database
Sepkoski, Jack Sepkoski's Online Genus Database
University of Bristol

External links

Belemnites
Jurassic cephalopods
Early Jurassic animals
Prehistoric cephalopod genera